The Women's 100 metre backstroke competition of the 2020 European Aquatics Championships was held on 20 and 21 May 2021.

Records
Before the competition, the existing world, European and championship records were as follows.

The following new records were set during this competition.

Results

Heats
The heats were started on 20 May at 10:55.

Swim-off
The swim-off was held on 20 May at 12:20.

Semifinals
The semifinals were held on 20 May at 18:12.

Semifinal 1

Semifinal 2

Final

First race 
The final was held on 21 May at 18:24.
The race was then declared void after the Swedish protested that the speaker in lane 1 malfunctioned and Hansson was not able to hear the starting gun.
A re-race was scheduled for 20:45.

Re race 
The final re race was held on 21 May at 20:45.

References

External links

Women's 100 metre backstroke